Mount Amida is an  mountain in Saeki-ku, Hiroshima, Japan.

References

Amida